The 2011 ITF Women's Circuit is the 2011 edition of the second-tier tour for women's professional tennis. It is organised by the International Tennis Federation and is a tier below the WTA Tour. The ITF Women's Circuit includes tournaments with prize money ranging from $10,000 up to $100,000.

Schedule

January–March

April–June

July–September

October–December

Retired players

Statistical information 

To avoid confusion and double counting, these tables should be updated only after the end of the week.

Key

Titles won by player 
As of July 11.

Titles won by nation 

 Iryna Brémond (née Kuryanovich) started representing France in March, but won two titles while representing Belarus.
 Jasmina Tinjić started representing Bosnia & Herzegovina in April, but won two titles while representing Croatia.

Ranking distribution 
"+H" indicates that Hospitality is provided.

References

External links 
 International Tennis Federation (ITF) official website

 
2011 in tennis
2011